The Selby–Driffield line formed part of a railway which connected the East Coast Main Line and the Yorkshire Coast Line. It crossed largely flat terrain and the Yorkshire Wolds and serviced the towns of Selby, Market Weighton, and Driffield.

History

Stations
Selby – opened 2 September 1834
Cliff Common – opened 1853, closed regular services 20 September 1954, used by specials until 1957
Duffield Gate – opened 1848, closed 1890
Menthorpe Gate – opened 1853, closed 7 December 1953
Bubwith – opened 1 August 1848, closed 20 September 1954
High Field – opened 1854, closed 20 September 1954
Foggathorpe – opened 1853, closed 20 September 1954
Holme Moor – opened 1 August 1848, closed 20 September 1954
Everingham – opened 1853, closed 20 September 1954
Market Weighton  – opened 4 October 1847, closed 29 November 1965
Enthorpe – opened 1 May 1890, closed 20 September 1954
Middleton-on-the-Wolds – opened 1 May 1890, closed 20 September 1954
Bainton – opened 1 May 1890, closed 20 September 1954
Southburn – opened 1 May 1890, closed 20 September 1954
Driffield – opened 6 October 1846

Closure
The line closed for regular passenger traffic on 20 September 1954, but a service of one regular non-stop train each way plus occasional summer excursions ran until June 1965. The line was abandoned after the last freight train ran later that year.

References

External links

Closed railway lines in Yorkshire and the Humber
Rail transport in the East Riding of Yorkshire